Sydney Trains is the operator of the suburban passenger rail network serving the city of Sydney, New South Wales, Australia.

It has metro-equivalent train frequencies of every three minutes or better in the underground core, 5–10 minutes off-peak at most inner-city and major stations and 15 minutes off-peak at most minor stations. During the weekday peak, train services are more frequent.

The network is managed by Transport for NSW, and is part of its Opal ticketing system. In 2018–19, 377.1 million passenger journeys were made on the network, making it the most used rail network in Australia.

History

In May 2012, the Minister for Transport announced a restructure of RailCorp, the organisation that owned and managed the metropolitan rail network and operated passenger services throughout New South Wales. Two new organisations were created to take over operation of the services from 1 July 2013. Sydney Trains acquired all suburban services in the Sydney metropolitan area bounded by Berowra, Emu Plains, Macarthur and Waterfall from RailCorp's CityRail division. Intercity and Hunter Line services previously operated by CityRail were taken over by NSW Trains (branded as NSW TrainLink). RailCorp remained as the owner of the network infrastructure. When first created as subsidiaries of RailCorp, Sydney Trains and NSW Trains were not controlled entities of RailCorp, but were instead controlled by Transport for NSW. In July, they ceased to be subsidiaries of RailCorp and became independent standalone agencies in July 2017.

Network changes
The first expansion of the Sydney suburban network during the Sydney Trains era occurred in 2015 when the South West Rail Link opened between Glenfield and Leppington.

In 2018, some sections of the network began to be transferred to the city's metro and light rail networks. The Epping-Chatswood Rail Link between Chatswood and Epping was closed for conversion in September 2018 to form part of the Sydney Metro Northwest, which opened in May 2019. The section of the Carlingford Line between Camellia and Carlingford closed in January 2020 and will form part of the Parramatta Light Rail network. The adjacent section of track between Clyde and Camellia, including Rosehill railway station, also became disused. The light rail is expected to open in 2023. The section of the Bankstown Line between Sydenham and Bankstown will form part of Sydney Metro City & Southwest, which is due to open in 2024.

Operations
In July 2013, Howard Collins, the former Chief Operating Officer of London Underground, was appointed as Chief Executive of Sydney Trains.
Stewart Mills was appointed Acting Chief Executive in February 2020, succeeded by Suzanne Holden as Acting Chief Executive in June 2020.

In addition to operating suburban train services, Sydney Trains maintains the New South Wales Metropolitan Rail Area, and maintains all but a handful of operational railway stations in the state.

Network
Sydney Trains operates electric suburban lines across metropolitan Sydney.

In conjunction with a new timetable released on 20 October 2013, the Sydney Trains network was reorganised with a new numbering system. The number of lines was reduced from eleven to seven by merging several lines.

An eighth line was created on 26 November 2017 by splitting the T2 line into two separate lines. T5 services were also modified to no longer travel to and from Campbelltown, instead starting and terminating at Leppington.

From 28 April 2019, the T1 line from Gordon to Hornsby via Strathfield was renumbered T9, whilst the portion from Berowra to Richmond & Emu Plains via Chatswood and Parramatta remained T1. T9 is red in colour.

The T6 Carlingford line, which operated between Clyde and Carlingford, ceased operations on 5 January 2020.

The main hub of the Sydney Trains system is Central station, which most lines pass through. Central is also the terminus of most NSW TrainLink lines. After leaving Central, trains coming from the T2 Inner West & Leppington Line, T3 Bankstown Line and T8 Airport & South Line then travel through the City Circle – a ring line beneath the Sydney central business district. After completing the City Circle, these trains pass through Central for a second time and return to the suburbs. The T1 North Shore & Western, T4 Eastern Suburbs & Illawarra and T9 Northern lines pass through the central business district and continue on to other areas of Sydney. The T5 Cumberland Line serves Western Sydney and provides access to the major centre of Parramatta from the south west of the city without requiring a change of trains at Granville. The T7 Olympic Park Line is a suburban shuttle service.

NightRide

NightRide bus services established in 1989, replace trains between midnight and 4:30am, leaving the tracks clear of trains for maintenance work. Such bus services mainly stop near stations operating typically at hourly intervals (some routes depart more frequently on weekends). Many services depart the city from bus stops near Town Hall station. NightRide services are contracted to external bus operators and are identified by route numbers beginning with "N".

Rolling stock

Sydney Trains operates a fleet of double deck electric multiple units. The trainsets are divided into the following classes:

Though primarily operated by NSW TrainLink, some H sets are also used on suburban services, and with the delivery of the D sets for operations on regional NSW TrainLink lines from 2020, most of the sets will be transferred to suburban services.

All A, B and M sets are maintained by Downer Rail. Their contract for the M sets was extended by 10 years from June 2017. All other types of trains including the V and H sets are maintained by UGL Unipart. The contract with UGL Unipart was extended for two years from 1 July 2019.

The Sydney Trains network is divided into three sectors, based around three maintenance depots. Trainsets are identified by target plates, which are exhibited on the front lower nearside of driving carriages. Each target plate includes the letter of the class the set belongs to and the number of the individual set. Waratahs do not have a target plate, but instead, have the information written directly on the front of the train. The composition and formations of train sets and the target designations are subject to alteration. M sets and H sets carry green target plates.

Patronage

The following table lists patronage figures for the network during the corresponding financial year. Australia's financial years start on 1 July and end on 30 June. Major events that affected the number of journeys made or how patronage is measured are included as notes.

Ticketing and costs
Sydney Trains currently uses the Opal card ticketing system which was introduced to the network in April 2014. The fare system is fully integrated with the Sydney Metro network and the NSW TrainLink Intercity network – trips involving suburban, metro and intercity services are calculated as a single fare and there is no interchange penalty. Students who use the Sydney Trains network to get to and from schools can apply for a free school Opal card. Opal is also valid on bus, ferry, and light rail services but separate fares apply for these modes. The following table lists Opal fares for reusable smartcards and single trip tickets:

^ = $2.50 for Senior/Pensioner cardholders

A surcharge is levied when using the two privately operated stations serving Sydney Airport:

As there are no return or periodical options available, reusable Opal cards include a number of caps to reduce the cost for frequent travellers:

The previous ticketing system was introduced in 1992 and was based on magnetic stripe technology. It was shut down on 1 August 2016.

See also 

 Commuter rail in Australia
 NSW TrainLink
 Railways in Sydney
List of Sydney Trains railway stations
 Proposed railways in Sydney
Sydney Metro

References

External links 

 Sydney Trains website
 Sydney Trains on transportnsw.info website

 
Government railway authorities of Australia
Transport
Railway companies of New South Wales
Passenger railway companies of Australia
Railway companies established in 2013
Railway infrastructure companies of Australia
Rail transport in Sydney
Australian companies established in 2013
1500 V DC railway electrification